Olgino is a rural locality (a village) in Borisoglebskoye Rural Settlement, Muromsky District, Vladimir Oblast, Russia. The population was 27 as of 2010.

Geography 
Olgino is located 35 km north of Murom (the district's administrative centre) by road. Tatarovo is the nearest rural locality.

References 

Rural localities in Muromsky District